Mo is a village in Vegårshei municipality in Agder county, Norway.

References

Villages in Agder
Vegårshei